Vetra may refer to:

 Vétra : the Société des Véhicules et Tracteurs Electriques, a French manufacturer of trolleybuses and electric locomotives, founded in 1925, dissolved in 1964.
 FK Vėtra : a Lithuanian football team from the capital city of Vilnius.
 Canale Vetra, or Canale Vepra, Milan artificial canal dating back to ancient Roman times